The Moscow Museum of Modern Art is a museum of modern and contemporary art located in Moscow, Russia. It was opened to public in December 1999. The project of the museum was initiated and executed by Zurab Tsereteli, president of the Russian Academy of Arts. In 2018, The  and Museum-Studio of Dmitry Nalbandyan merged into the Moscow Museum of Modern Arts.

Location

The Moscow Museum of Modern Art is situated at 25 Petrovka St., near the Petrovsky Boulevard in central Moscow. It is housed in the former Gubin's mansion, an imposing monument of the 18th century neoclassical movement, designed by the noted Russian architect Matvei Kazakov.

In December 2003, the museum expanded its galleries to a second location — the exhibition hall at the Ermolayevsky Pereulok, Patriarshiye Ponds area, also a historic building of the Moscow city center. The spacious refurbished halls of the premises provide for vast exhibitions of multiple art projects. The exhibition hall has been inaugurated by the "Artconstitution" - a major show, in which nearly one hundred contemporary Russian artists took part. As a result of the ensued wave of public interest, numerous international exhibitions followed. One of them was a display sponsored by FotoFest (Houston, Texas, U.S.), featuring 260 photographic masterpieces by 24 artists from the United States as well as 12 other countries in Europe, Asia and Latin America.

On February 7, 2007, the Moscow Museum of Modern Art opened its third exhibition venue — Gallery at Tverskoy boulevard, 9.

Building at Gogolevsky Boulevard, 10  is also the creation of the architect Matvey Kazakov.It was built in the late XVIII century and belonged to the Tsurikov-Naryshkin. Currently, there are major international exhibition projects, scientific and practical conferences, symposiums.

On Bolshaya Gruzinskaya, 15 in Moscow there is a house built by merchant Vasily Gorbunov at the end of the 19th century. Today there is a museum of the artist Zurab Tsereteli. The exposition includes a collection of works by Zurab Tsereteli and a collection of his monumental sculptures in the courtyard along with mosaic and stained-glass compositions.

The Vadim Sidur Museum (Novogireevskaya Street, 37A) is a museum of contemporary sculpture in Moscow housing the collection of artworks by Vadim Sidur, a sculptor, artist and poet renowned both in Russia and abroad, an excellent exponent of the Soviet nonconformist art.

The Museum-Studio of Dmitry Nalbandyan (Tverskaya street, 8/2) is part of the Moscow Museum of Modern Art since 2018. It contains over 1500 artist's works: paintings, sketches, drawings, photographs and personal belongings.

Collection
The core of the museum's assemblage was constituted from the private collection of Zurab Tsereteli, its founder and director. Artworks of many renowned international artists are exhibited in the museum's permanent collection halls like Marcus Jansen. The highlights include objects and sculpture by Armand, the “Sun Disk” by the famous Italian sculptor Arnaldo Pomodoro,  the installation “CIS Ant Farm” by the Japanese conceptualist Yukinori Yanagi, as well as other works of contemporary art based on contemporary technologies. The masters of European and American art, such as Pablo Picasso, Fernand Léger, Salvador Dalí, Joan Miró and Rufino Tamayo, are represented by their lithographs.

A special emphasis has been given to the collection of Russian avant-garde art. The museum spotlights works of world-famous artists of the turn of the 20th century: Kazimir Malevich, Alexandra Exter, Natalia Goncharova, Robert Falk, Ivan Pouni, Vladimir Baranov-Rossine and David Burlyuk (30 pieces). Visitors can also become acquainted with two compositions by Kandinsky’s friend Vladimir Izdebski, who is known for his “Salons de Paris” series after the revolution of 1917, and also a unique collection by the famous Georgian artist Niko Pirosmani.

The museum displays the interesting exposition dedicated to the art of non-conformists of the 1950–70s, whose creative activity was in the opposition to the Soviet ideology.  Among them are V. Nemukhin, E. Steinberg, V. Komar, A. Melamid, A. Ney, O. Rabin, A. Zverev, D. Krasnopevtsev, and more.

Contemporaries are represented by Boris Orlov, Dmitry Prigov, Francisco Infante, Oleg Kulik, A. Brodski, Aidan Salakhov, Lena Hades, Valery Koshlyakov, Igor Novikov and Serguei Shutov. They are mostly focused on forms of the so-called “actual” art.

The Moscow Museum of Modern Art contains works of art from the first decades of the 20th century;  the exposition is based on contrasts and correlations of artistic trends and events in Russia and abroad, and is also aimed at showing the integrity of the development of world culture, while specifying the role of the Russian art in it.

To celebrate its 20th birthday, the institution invited 20 celebrities from all walks of life to curate its anniversary exhibition. The guest curators include Russian football star Fedor Smolov, designer Andrei Artemov, writer Vladimir Sorokin, TV showman and art collector Andrey Malakhov, theatre director Kirill Serebrennikov and even Marusya (Mail.ru's voice-controlled personal assistant).

Education
Today the museum is renowned not only for its collections and exhibits, but it is also known as a center of artistic education.  The School of Modern Art (by the name of "Free Studios") works alongside the museum, featuring a two-year program which is realized in concrete practice in creative studiowork.  Included in the program are lectures on modern art, the study of contemporary visual art technologies, mastery of a broad spectrum of intellectual problems surrounding contemporary culture and familiarization with today's art market.

Research and conservation
The research work of the museum revolves around the museum's collection. There is a research library at the museum, with a vast collection of Russian and international art publications. The museum's laboratory is a nationally recognized center of conservation-related research.

Publishing
Publishing is one of the top priorities in MMOMA's educational activities. Museum publications are richly illustrated art books and albums, catalogues of the museum collection and exhibition catalogues, with texts be prominent art historians, critics and curators, as well as artists. The museum's Dialogue of Arts magazine covers the history and theory of contemporary art, and contemporary art practice.

Nearest Metro: Gogolevskiy 10 Kropotkinskaya, Ermolaevskiy 17 Mayakovskaya, Petrovka 25, Tverskoy 9 Chekhovskaya, Pushkinskaya, Tverskaya

References

External links 

 Official Website of the Moscow Museum of Modern Art (in Russian and English)
 Moscow Museum of Modern Art Profile at "Museums Around the World"
 Information on the Moscow Museum of Modern Art
 Group of the Moscow Museum of Modern Art on Facebook

Art museums and galleries in Moscow
Modern art museums
Art museums established in 1999
1999 establishments in Russia